Hausen is a quarter of Frankfurt am Main, Germany. It is part of the Ortsbezirk Mitte-West.

Education

The Japanische Internationale Schule Frankfurt, a Japanese international school, is in Hausen.

References

Districts of Frankfurt